Pine Lake is the smallest city in DeKalb County, Georgia, United States. The population was 752 at the 2020 census.

History
Pine Lake was established as a city in December 1937, after a short life as a summer retreat run by the Pine Woods Corporation. The corporation sold lots around a small fishing lake to Atlantans who lived in (then) faraway areas like Buckhead for use as a weekend retreat. The 20' x 100' lots sold for $69, and the advertisement for lots directed people "from Decatur down the [unpaved] Rockbridge Road East." Many homeowners continued to use their property as a weekend getaway long after the city incorporated. Prior to development, Pine Lake was a portion of a farm. The lake was formerly a widened region of Snapfinger Creek, and the valley that encompasses much of the town was where corn was grown. The lake was dammed by the Army Corps of Engineers as erosion and flood control, prior to the official FDR lake projects.

Geography
Pine Lake is located at  (33.791505, -84.206428).

Demographics

2020 census

As of the 2020 United States census, there were 752 people, 386 households, and 199 families residing in the city.

2000 census
As of the census of 2000, there were 621 people, 321 households, and 139 families residing in the city. The population data was challenged in 2002 and the Census agreed that the housing units were under surveyed. The insufficient survey was due to the lack of postal delivery in the city (as with cities with fewer than 750 individual units). The Tax digest listed 690 houses. Since no official survey was done on all households, the Census did not change the population. The racial makeup of the city was 74.72% White, 17.55% African American, 0.16% Native American, 0.16% Pacific Islander, 3.54% from other races, and 3.86% from two or more races. Hispanic or Latino of any race were 6.76% of the population.

There were 321 households, out of which 18.4% had children under the age of 18 living with them, 26.5% were married couples living together, 12.8% had a female householder with no husband present, and 56.4% were non-families. 39.9% of all households were made up of individuals, and 2.8% had someone living alone who was 65 years of age or older.  The average household size was 1.93 and the average family size was 2.58.

In the city, the population was spread out, with 15.6% under the age of 18, 6.9% from 18 to 24, 43.2% from 25 to 44, 27.2% from 45 to 64, and 7.1% who were 65 years of age or older.  The median age was 38 years. For every 100 females, there were 91.7 males.  For every 100 females age 18 and over, there were 81.9 males.

The median income for a household in the city was $41,029, and the median income for a family was $35,313. Males had a median income of $31,250 versus $28,295 for females. The per capita income for the city was $21,529.  About 11.4% of families and 15.5% of the population were below the poverty line, including 27.0% of those under age 18 and 8.1% of those age 65 or over.

Education
Residents are zoned to schools in the DeKalb County School District.
 Stone Mountain High School
 Stone Mountain Middle School
 Rockbridge Elementary School

All of the schools are located outside of the Pine Lake city limits in unincorporated sections of DeKalb County.

In Media
Welcome to Pine Lake, is a documentary feature film released in 2020 by ViacomCBS. The largely observational film looks at the all-women leadership in the predominantly white city of Pine Lake. The documentary claims that the primary funding source of the City’s police force is from traffic tickets issued predominately to people of color from the surrounding communities. According to National Public Radio member station KCRW, the filmmaker “found that this progressive town was participating in an unfair and ultimately racist criminal justice system.” In February, 2022, The Atlanta Journal-Constitution wrote, " 'Welcome to Pine Lake'  is a scathing indictment of the privilege of obliviousness when it comes to class and race."

References

External links

 City of Pine Lake official website
 Pine Lake Association of Involved Neighbors
 Documentary reveals how a small Georgia city's history of over-policing belies its liberal image - CBS News - October 2020

Cities in Georgia (U.S. state)
Cities in DeKalb County, Georgia
Cities in the Atlanta metropolitan area